The Amy Gillett Bikeway or Amy Gillett Rail Trail or Amy Gillett Pathway is a shared path in the Adelaide Hills on part of the alignment of the former Mount Pleasant railway line. It is a  sealed path suitable for recreational cycling, walking and horse riding. The trail is named after Australian track cyclist and rower Amy Gillett.

Stage 1 was opened in January 2010 by Patrick Conlon, then the South Australian Minister for Transport, Energy and Infrastructure. Stage 1 extended  between Oakbank and Woodside, with kerbside bike lanes on Onkaparinga Valley Road continuing south from the trailhead through Oakbank. Stage 2 extended it through Charleston and Stage 3 opened in May 2014 added  to Mount Torrens. Future work could extend it another  through Birdwood to Mount Pleasant. There are also several side loop trails available to interesting destinations off the main path.

References

External links
 https://web.archive.org/web/20141218121522/http://adelaidehillsrailtrail.org.au/

Cycling in South Australia
Rail trails in Australia
Cycleways in South Australia
Adelaide Hills